Kundha is a river flowing in the Erode district of the Indian state of Tamil Nadu.

See also 
 List of rivers of Tamil Nadu

References 

Rivers of Tamil Nadu
Erode district
Rivers of India